Reizei can refer to:
Emperor Reizei, emperor of Japan
 Reizei family, a branch of the Fujiwara family